The 2011–12 Conference USA men's basketball season marks the 17th season of Conference USA basketball.

Preseason
On October 10, 2011, Cameron Moore of UAB was named Preseason Player of the Year.

Preseason teams

References